Schizosthetus lyriformis is a species of mite in the family Parasitidae that feeds of bark beetle larvae and eggs. The species was discovered in 1996 by McGraw and Farrier. Schizosthetus lyriformis is strongly associated with bark beetles, with a geographic range matching that of their most common hosts.

References 

Parasitidae
Animals described in 1969